Lagraulet-du-Gers is a commune in the Gers department in southwestern France.

Geography
The Auzoue flows north through the middle of the commune.

Population

See also
Communes of the Gers department

References

Communes of Gers